Aristide Cavaillé-Coll (4 February 1811 – 13 October 1899) was a French organ builder. He has the reputation of being the most distinguished organ builder of the 19th century. He pioneered innovations in the art and science of organ building that permeated the profession and influenced the course of organ building, composing and improvising through the early 20th century. As the author of scientific journal articles about the organ construction details, he published the results of his research and experiments. He was the inventor of the symphonic organ being able to follow smooth and immediate dynamic changes like a symphonic orchestra. This goal was reached by: a) invention of harmonic flue and reed stops, such as the ''flûte harmonique'', ''trompette harmonique'', ''clairon harmonique'', b) invention of divided windchest with 2-3 different wind pressure sections, c) creation of groups of stops (jeux d'anches and jeux de fonds) allowing for fast dynamics changes without taking hands out of the keyboards by the organist, d) organ specification planning on the base of ''orchestral quartet". His most famous organs were built in Paris in Saint-Denis Basilica (1841), Église de la Madeleine, Sainte-Clotilde Basilica (1859), Saint-Sulpice church (his largest instrument; behind the classical façade), Notre-Dame Cathedral (behind the classical façade), baron Albert de L'Espée's residence in Biarritz (moved finally to the Sacré-Cœur Basilica), and many others. After Cavaillé-Coll's death, Charles Mutin maintained the business into the beginning of the 20th century. The organ reform movement in the 20th century sought to return organ building to a more Baroque style; but since then, Cavaillé-Coll's designs have come back into fashion.

Life 

Born in Montpellier, France, to Dominique, one in a line of organ builders, he showed early talent in mechanical innovation. He exhibited an outstanding fine art when designing and building his famous instruments. There is a before and an after Cavaillé-Coll. His organs are "symphonic organs": that is, they can reproduce the sounds of other instruments and combine them as well. His largest and greatest organ is in Saint-Sulpice, Paris. Featuring 100 stops and five manuals, this instrument, which unlike many others remains practically unaltered, is a candidate to become a UNESCO World Heritage Site.

Cavaillé-Coll was also known for his financial problems - he focused mostly on the organ building art, leaving finance less attention. The art of his handcrafted instruments, unparalleled at that time, was not enough to ensure his firm's survival. It was taken over in 1898, shortly before his death, by Charles Mutin, who continued in the organ business, but by the 1940s the firm had almost disappeared.

Cavaillé-Coll died in Paris on 13 October 1899 and is buried in the Montparnasse Cemetery.

Organ building innovations
Cavaillé-Coll is responsible for many innovations that revolutionized organ building, performance and composition. Instead of the Positif, Cavaillé-Coll placed the Grand-Orgue manual as the lowest manual, and included couplers that allowed the entire tonal resources of the organ to be played from the Grand-Orgue. He refined the English swell box by devising a spring-loaded (later balanced) pedal with which the organist could operate the swell shutters, thus increasing the organ's potential for expression. He adjusted pipe making and voicing techniques, thus creating a whole family of harmonic stops (flutes, trompettes, clairons) and stops imitating orchestral instruments such as the bassoon, the oboe and the english horn. He popularized the harmonic flute stop, which, together with the montre (principals), the gambe (strings) and the bourdon (flutes), formed the fonds (foundations) of the organ. He designed the "orchestral quartet" which referred to orchestral four colours of sound - principals, flutes, strings and reeds. He introduced divided windchests which were controlled by ventils. These allowed the use of higher wind pressures and for each manual's anches (reed stops) to be added or subtracted as a group by means of a pedal. Higher wind pressures allowed the organ to include many more stops of 8' (unison) pitch in every division, so complete fonds as well as reed choruses could be placed in every division, designed to be superimposed on top of one another. Sometimes he placed the treble part of the compass on a higher pressure than the bass, to emphasize melody lines and counteract the natural tendency of small pipes (especially reeds) to be softer.

For a mechanical tracker action and its couplers to operate under these higher wind pressures, pneumatic assistance provided by the Barker lever was required, which Cavaillé-Coll included in his larger instruments. This device made it possible to couple all the manuals together and play on the full organ without expending a great deal of effort. He also invented the pneumatic combination action system for his five-manual organ at Église Saint-Sulpice, Paris. All these innovations allowed a seamless crescendo from pianissimo all the way to fortissimo, something never before possible on the organ. His organ at the Basilique Ste-Clotilde, Paris (proclaimed a basilica by Pope Leo XIII in 1897) was one of the first to be built with several of these new features. Consequently, it influenced César Franck, who was the titular organist there. The organ works of Franck have inspired generations of organist-composers who came after him. It is worth to underline that Cavaillé-Coll's concept of symphonic organ was developed during his whole professional career inspired by influenced organists his times.

Legacy 
Marcel Dupré stated once that "composing for an orchestra is quite different from composing for an organ... with exception of Master Cavaillé-Coll's symphonic organs: in that case one has to observe an extreme attention when writing for such kind of instruments." Almost a century beforehand, César Franck had ecstatically said of the rather modest Cavaillé-Coll instrument at l'Église St.-Jean-St.-François in Paris with words that summed up everything the builder was trying to do: "Mon nouvel orgue ? C'est un orchestre !" ("My new organ? It's an orchestra!"). Franck later became organist of a much larger Cavaillé-Coll organ at St Clotilde in Paris. In 1878 Franck was featured recitalist on the four-manual Cavaillé-Coll organ at the Palais du Trocadéro in the Trocadéro area of Paris; this organ was subsequently rebuilt by V. & F. Gonzalez in 1939 and reinstalled in the Palais de Chaillot which replaced the Palais de Trocadéro, then rebuilt in 1975 by Danion-Gonzalez and relocated to the Auditorium Maurice Ravel in Lyon.  Franck's Trois Pièces were premiered on the Trocadéro organ.

Film 
A documentary film titled The Genius of Cavaillé-Coll was released in 2012 by Fugue State Films to mark both the 200th anniversary of Cavaillé-Coll's birth in 2011 and the 150th anniversary of his organ at St Sulpice. It won the DVD Documentary Award of the BBC Music Awards 2014.

Existing Cavaillé-Coll organs 
For a complete list of all organs by Cavaillé-Coll, see:

In Europe

In France
Bergerac: Saint Jacques
Bonsecours: Basilique Notre-Dame
Caen: Abbey of Saint-Étienne (50 stops, 3 manuals)
Carcassonne: Cathedral
Castelnau-d'Estrétefonds: Saint-Martin
Dreux: Chapelle royale
Épernay: Saint-Pierre Saint-Paul
Lavaur: Cathedral
Luçon: Cathedral
Lyon: Saint-François-de-Sales
Orléans: Cathedral
Mazamet: Saint-Sauveur
Nancy: Cathedral (65 stops, 4 manuals)
Paris: American Cathedral (72 stops, 4 manuals)
Paris: Saint-Roch
Paris: La Madeleine (58 stops, 3 manuals)
Paris: Notre-Dame-de-la-Croix (26 stops, 2 manuals)
Paris: Notre Dame
Paris: Notre-Dame-de-l'Assomption
Paris: Pentemont Abbey
Paris: Saint-Antoine-des-Quinze-Vingts
Paris: Sainte-Clotilde Basilica (71 stops, 3 manuals)
Paris: Saint-Sulpice (102 stops, 5 manuals)
Paris: Saint-Vincent-de-Paul (66 stops, 3 manuals)
Paris: Sainte-Trinité (61 stops, 3 manuals)
Paris: Saint-Jean-de-Montmartre (28 stops, 2 manuals)
Paris: Sacré-Cœur (78 stops, 4 manuals)
Paris: Val-de-Grâce
Courbevoie (near Paris): Saint-Maurice de Bécon
Perpignan: Cathedral
Rabastens: Notre-Dame-du-Bourg Church (smallest, with only 20 stops)
Rouen: Church of St. Ouen. (64 stops, 4 manuals)
Saint-Denis: Basilica (47 stops, 4 manuals)
Saint-Germain-en-Laye: Saint-Germain church
Saint-Omer: Cathedral (49 stops, 4 manuals)
Saint-Yrieix-la-Perche: Collégiale du Moustier
Toulouse: Saint-Sernin Basilica (51 stops, 3 manuals)
Trouville-sur-Mer: Notre-Dame des Victoires
Vimoutiers: Notre-Dame
Yport: Eglise saint-Martin

In Spain
Alegia: San Juan
Azkoitia: Santa María
Azpeitia: Basílica de Loyola
Bilbao: Santa María de Begoña
Getaria (Guetaria): San Salvador
Irún: Santa María
Lekeitio: 
Madrid: Basílica de San Francisco el Grande
Mutriku (Motrico): Santa Catalina
Oiartzun: San Esteban
Pasaia (Pasajes)
San Sebastián (Donostia): Résidence de Zorroaga
San Sebastián (Donostia): San Marcial d’Altza
San Sebastián (Donostia): Santa María del Coro
San Sebastián (Donostia): Santa Teresa
San Sebastián (Donostia): San Vicente
Urnieta: San Miguel
Vidania (Bidegoyan), San Bartolomé

In the United Kingdom
 Channel Islands, Jersey: Highlands College
 Cheshire, Warrington: Parr Hall
 Hampshire, Farnborough: St Michael's Abbey
 Hampshire, Isle of Wight: Quarr Abbey
 Manchester:  The Town Hall
 Renfrewshire, Paisley: Paisley Abbey

In the Netherlands
 Amsterdam: Augustinuskerk 
 Amsterdam: Joannes en Ursulakapel Begijnhof
Haarlem: Philharmonie

In Belgium
Brussels: Royal Conservatory of Music
Gesves : Saint Maximin (50 stops, 4 manuals)
Ghent: Saint Nicholas' Church, Ghent
Hasselt: Sacred Heart Church
Leuven: Jesuit Church Heverlee
Leuven: Saint Joseph's Church

In Portugal
 Lisbon, Portugal: Igreja de São Luís dos Franceses
 Lisbon, Portugal: Igreja de São Mamede

In Italy
 Rome, Italy: Chapel of the Casa Santa Maria of the Pontifical North American College
In addition, Cavaillé-Coll designed a large but never-built pipe organ for Saint Peter's Basilica, where a 1/10 scale model is preserved.

In Denmark
 Copenhagen, Denmark: Jesus Church (1890)

In Russia

 Moscow, Russia: Bolshoi Hall of Moscow Conservatory, Russia (installed by Charles Mutin)

In Latin America

In Venezuela
 Caracas: Iglesia de la Parroquia San Francisco. Used for regular service.  
 Caracas: Iglesia de la Parroquia Altagracia (Inoperative)
 Caracas: Iglesia de la Parroquia Santa Teresa. Used for regular service.
 Caracas: Iglesia de la Parroquia San José (In a delicate situation)
 Caracas: Parroquia La Encarnación del Valle. After several decades of silence, it's been played regularly since in 2011.
 Los Teques: Catedral (Inoperative)

In Brazil
 Belém: Catedral da Sé (1882)
 Campinas: Catedral Metropolitana (1883)
 Campo Largo: Igreja Matriz de Nossa Senhora da Piedade (1892)
 Itu: Igreja Matriz Nossa Senhora da Candelária (1882)
 Jundiaí: Catedral de Nossa Senhora do Desterro (1895)
 Lorena: Catedral Nossa Senhora da Piedade (1889)
 Rio de Janeiro: Igreja Nossa Senhora do Carmo da Lapa (1898)
 Rio de Janeiro: Capela do Colégio Sion do Cosme Velhos (Mutin)
 Rio de Janeiro: Igreja de Nossa Senhora de Bonsucesso (Mutin)
 Rio de Janeiro: Capela da Santa Casa (1882)
 Salvador: Igreja da Ordem Terceira do Carmo (1888)
 São Paulo: Igreja de São José do Ipiranga (1863)
 São Paulo: Igreja do Senhor Bom Jesus do Brás (1875)

In Mexico
 Mazatlán, Mexico: Catedral Basílica de la Inmaculada Concepción

In Chile
 Valparaíso, Chile: Iglesia de los Sagrados Corazones (French Fathers Church) (1872)

In Argentina
Most of the instruments in this list were sold and installed by Mutin-Cavaillé Coll, successor of Cavaillé Coll business after his death in 1899. Argentina was a strong demander of pipe organs in the first decades of XXth century, in such degree that the company installed a branch in Buenos Aires city at that time, with two shops: one located in street Estados Unidos number 3199, the other one in street 24 de Noviembre number 884.
 Lujan, Basilica de Lujan
 Basílica del Santísimo Sacramento (1912)
 Capilla del Colegio "La Salle" (1926)
 Iglesia de San Juan Bautista (ca. 1920)
 Basílica del Sagrado Corazón de Jesús (ca. 1906)
 Basílica de San Nicolás de Bari (órgano principal)
 Basílica de San Nicolás de Bari (órgano de la cripta)
 Capilla de la "Casa de la empleada"
 Parroquia de "Nuestra Señora del Valle"
 Parroquia de "San Martín de Tours" (ca. 1910)
 Parroquia de "San Cristobal"
 Catedral de San Isidro (1906)
 Parroquia de "Nuestra Señora de Aránzazu" (San Fernando) (1907)
 Parroquia de "San Francisco Solano" (Bella Vista) (1906)

In Costa Rica
Parroquia Inmaculada Concepción (Heredia) (ca. 1904)
Parroquia Nuestra Señora de la Soledad (San José) (ca. 1906)

In Asia
 Fuji, Japan: Haus Sonnenschein
 Beijing, China: Beitang (in regular use through at least 1938)

Asteroid 
Cavaillé-Coll's name was given to an asteroid: 5184 Cavaillé-Coll.

Further reading 
 Bicknell, Stephen. Cavaillé-Coll's Four Fonds
 Cavaillé-Coll, Cécile (1929). Aristide Cavaillé-Coll: Ses Origines, Sa Vie, Ses Oeuvres. Paris: Fischbacher.
 Douglass, Fenner (1999). Cavaillé-Coll and the French Romantic Tradition. New Haven: Yale University Press.
 Huybens, Gilbert (1985). Cavaillé-Coll: Liste des travaux exécutés/Werkverzeichnis. Lauffen/Neckar: Orgelbau-Fachverlag Rensch. .

References

External links 

 Association Aristide Cavaille-Coll 
 French government Ministry of Culture: Aristide Cavaillé-Coll, Organ Builder
 Writings of Aristide Cavaillé-Coll 

1811 births
1899 deaths
French pipe organ builders
Burials at Montparnasse Cemetery
Musical instrument manufacturing companies of France